Martha Collins (born 1940) is a poet, translator, and editor. She has published ten books of poetry, including Night Unto Night (Milkweed, 2018),Admit One: An American Scrapbook (Pitt Poetry Series, 2016), Day Unto Day (Milkweed, 2014), White Papers (Pitt Poetry Series, 2012), and Blue Front (Graywolf, 2006), as well as two chapbooks and four books of co-translations from the Vietnamese. She has also co-edited, with Kevin Prufer and Martin Rock, a volume of poems by Catherine Breese Davis, accompanied by essays and an interview about the poet’s life and work.

Life
Martha Collins was born in Omaha, Nebraska, and raised in Des Moines, Iowa. She graduated from Stanford University with a B.A., and the University of Iowa with an M.A. and a Ph.D. She taught at University of Massachusetts Boston, where she founded the Creative Writing Program in 1979; beginning in 1997, she was the Pauline Delaney Professor of Creative Writing at Oberlin College for ten years. In spring 2010, she served as Distinguished Visiting Writer at Cornell University, and in spring 2013 was Visiting Fannie Hurst Professor of Creative Literature at Washington University in St. Louis. She is currently editor-at-large for FIELD magazine and one of the editors of the Oberlin College Press, as well as a contributing editor to Consequence Magazine and Copper Nickel.

In 1993 Collins began teaching in the summer workshop of the William Joiner Institute for the Study of War and Social Consequences where she met several writers from Vietnam, including poet Nguyen Quang Thieu. The next year she studied Vietnamese, and in 1998 published her co-translations of Nguyen Quang Thieu’s poems. Since then she has published three more co-translated volumes of Vietnamese poetry.

She is a featured faculty member at the 2018 Poetry Seminar at The Frost Place in Franconia, NH.

Poetry 
Known in her first few books for somewhat formal lyrical poems that occasionally referenced larger issues such as homelessness and war, Collins learned from an exhibit of lynching postcards in 2000 that the hanging her father said he had witnessed as a child was actually a lynching of an African American man, attended by 10,000 people in Cairo, Illinois.  In 2005 Collins published Blue Front, a book-length poem that involved research and focused on the event, and in 2012 she explored issues of race from both personal and historical perspectives in White Papers. Her latest book, Admit One: An American Scrapbook, addresses racism, eugenics, immigration and other issues, focusing on the early twentieth-century eugenics movement.

Cynthia Hogue has described Collins as “a dazzling poet whose poetry is poised at the juncture between the lyric and ethics [and who] has addressed some of the most traumatic social issues of the twentieth century . . . in supple and complex poems.  Those who have followed Collins’ books have long since realized that no subject is off limits for her piercing intellect."

Awards
 Best American Poetry 2013
 Ohioana Poetry Award, 2013, 2007
 Visiting Artist, Siena Art Institute, 2013
 Honorary Doctoral Degree, Cleveland State University, 2008
 Anisfield-Wolf Book Award (2007) for Blue Front
 25 Books to Remember, New York Public Library, 2006
 Laurence Goldstein Poetry Prize, Michigan Quarterly Review, 2005
 Lannan Foundation Residency Grant, 2003
 Witter Bynner / Santa Fe Art Institute Grant, 2001
 American Literary Translators Association Finalist Award, 1998
 Pushcart Prize, 1998, 1996, 1985
 Gordon Barber Memorial Award, Poetry Society of America, 1992
 National Endowment for the Arts Fellowship, 1990
 Peregrine Smith Poetry Competition for The Arrangement of Space, 1990
 Alice Fay Di Castagnola Award, Poetry Society of America, 1990
 Ingram Merrill Foundation Fellowship, 1988
 Breadloaf Fellowship, 1985
 Mary Carolyn Davies Memorial Award, Poetry Society of America, 1985
 Bunting Institute Fellowship, Radcliffe College, 1982–83
 National Endowment for the Humanities Fellowship, 1977–78

Works

Poetry
Because What Else Could I Do (Pitt Poetry, 2019)
Night Unto Night (Milkweed, 2018)
Admit One: An American Scrapbook (Pitt Poetry, 2016)
Day Unto Day (Milkweed, 2014)
White Papers (Pitt Poetry, 2012)
Sheer (Barnwood, 2008) chapbook 

"Their Work," "Time Was," "Through," from  Martha Collins, Gone So Far (2005)

History of a Small Life on a Windy Planet (University of Georgia Press,1993)
The Arrangement of Space (Gibbs Smith, 1991)
The Catastrophe of Rainbows (Cleveland State University, 1985)

Editor
 Into English: Poems, Translations, Commentaries, with Kevin Prufer (Graywolf, 2017) 
 Catherine Breese Davis: On the Life and Work of an American Master (Pleiades Press, 2015), with Kevin Prufer and Martin Rock
 Critical Essays on Louise Bogan (G.K. Hall, 1984)

Translator
Black Stars: Poems by Ngo Tu Lap, co-translated with the author (Milkweed, 2013)
Green Rice: Poems by Lâm Thị Mỹ Dạ, co-translated with Thuy Dinh (Curbstone, 2005)
The Women Carry River Water: Poems by Nguyen Quang Thieu, co-translated with the author (University of Massachusetts Press, 1997)

Anthologies
 
 
 
 
 
 
 Bill Henderson, ed. (1996). Pushcart Prize: Best of the Small Presses (Pushcart Press, 1996)
 Bill Henderson, ed. (1998). Pushcart Prize: Best of the Small Presses (Pushcart Press, 1998)

References

External links
"Author's website"
Interview at Mass Poetry 
Interview at Coal Hill Review
"Poet Martha Collins Reads 'From the Sky'", NPR
"Interview with Martha Collins"
"Why Poetry and Prose Matter: A conversation with Pamela Alexander and Martha Collins", ATS,  March 1999 
 The C.O.W.S. White Poetry On Racism

Living people
1940 births
University of Massachusetts Boston faculty
Oberlin College faculty
Stanford University alumni
University of Iowa alumni
American women poets
20th-century American poets
20th-century American women writers
21st-century American poets
21st-century American women writers
Writers from Omaha, Nebraska
Poets from Nebraska
Writers from Des Moines, Iowa
Poets from Iowa
American women academics
Cornell University faculty
Washington University in St. Louis faculty